Selkirk Communications was a Canadian radio and television broadcasting company, which operated from 1959 to 1989. Evolving out of Taylor, Pearson & Carson, a local broadcaster in Vancouver founded in 1934, the company grew to own 14 radio stations, six television stations (three wholly owned and three partially owned) and cable television holdings across Canada and the world.

Selkirk was eventually acquired by Maclean-Hunter in 1988. When the sale was finalized the following year, Maclean-Hunter sold almost all of the company's broadcast properties to WIC and Rogers Communications, retaining ownership only of Selkirk's cable holdings and one radio station. Maclean-Hunter was itself acquired by Rogers in 1994.

Holdings as of 1988 sale

Radio

Maclean-Hunter sold all of the Western Canadian stations to Rogers Communications, retaining ownership only of CFNY in Toronto.

 Banff/Canmore - CFHC
 Blairmore - CJPR
 Calgary - CFAC
 Edmonton - CJCA, CJCA-FM
 Grande Prairie - CFGP
 Lethbridge - CJOC, CILA
 Squamish/Whistler - CISQ
 Toronto - CFNY
 Vancouver - CKWX, CKKS
 Vernon - CJIB
 Victoria - CJVI

Television

All of Selkirk's television stations were sold to Western International Communications by Maclean-Hunter.

External links 
 History of Selkirk Communications Ltd. - Canadian Communications Foundation

Defunct cable and DBS companies of Canada
Defunct broadcasting companies of Canada
Radio broadcasting companies of Canada
Mass media companies established in 1959
Mass media companies disestablished in 1989
Canadian companies established in 1959